The House of Cámara (also known in Spanish as de la Cámara or in Portuguese as da Câmara or Gonçalves da Câmara) is an Iberian aristocratic family that originates from the early 13th century Kingdom of Castile. The family was originally knighted after fighting under King Ferdinand III of Castile during the Battle of Baeza (1227).  In the following centuries, they would serve the Spanish Crown fighting in many of the battles of the Reconquista.

A cadet branch of the family established itself in the Kingdom of Portugal. The Portuguese branch are direct descendants of João Gonçalves da Câmara (Zarco), who discovered and conquered the island of Madeira. From the 15th century until the end of the donataries' regime, they maintained the hereditary title of Captain-Major (Capitães dos Donatários) on the island of São Miguel in the Azores. Serving the Portuguese Crown, the family received various noble titles, including: Counts of Calheta (1576), Count of Vila Franca (1583 ), Count of Ribeira Grande (1662), Marquis of Castelo Melhor (1766), Count of Taipa (1823), Marquis of Ribeira Grande (1855), Count of Canavial (1880), among others.

In the sixteenth century, Juan de la Cámara was one of the main Spanish conquistadores responsible for the Spanish conquest of Yucatán and was one of the founders of the city of Mérida. His descendants live there to this day and are one of the principal families of the Mexican nobility. For many years, the Cámara family were the owners of Cancún and its surroundings, the site of one of the most important tourist destinations in the Caribbean At the end of the 19th century and the beginning of the 20th century, the family made a considerable fortune due to the boom of the Henequen industry in Yucatan.

History
The origins of the family date back to 1227 when Gonzalo de la Cámara, a military officer, was ennobled by orders of King Ferdinand III of Castile, thus recognizing his outstanding participation in the surrender of Baeza by the Moors.

Although Gonzalo de la Cámara was originally from Alcalá de Henares, his descendants settled in Galicia, in the north of Spain; One of the most distinguished was Juan Rodríguez de la Cámara, a poet from the late 15th century who was born in Padrón, a municipality in the Galician province of La Coruña. Speaking about his family origins, the Spanish Royal Academy of History (Real Academia de la Historia) tells us that his “family name, Cámara, appears registered in the tomb of the main local church, he must have been born in the Galician town of his last name or in its vicinity in the last years of the fourteenth century, in a family belonging to the nobility.” Over time, a branch of the family settled in the neighboring Kingdom of Portugal. In 1420, João Gonçalves da Câmara (Zarco), a descendant of this line, discovered the Archipelago of Madeira.

For many centuries, the family maintained the hereditary title of Captain-Major (Capitães dos Donatários) of the island of São Miguel in the Azores. Similarly, for five hundred years, until the dissolution of the Portuguese monarchy in 1910, his descendants held no less than 2 marquisate, 5 countships and a lordship, becoming one of the most important noble families of the Kingdom of Portugal. By 1520, the heraldry of the  family was already represented in the Livro do Armeiro-Mor, the oldest and most important armorial of the Kingdom of Portugal that included the arms of royalty and the main noble families of Europe.

In 1573, the captain of São Miguel, Manuel da Câmara passed on the administration of the island to his son Rui Gonçalves da Câmara (the third such Rui in the family), and went to live in Lisbon until his death in 1578, at a time when the reign of the Cardinal King was nearing its end. Following the king's death several pretenders lined-up to assume the monarchy, including Philip II of Spain, António, Prior of Crato and the Infanta Catherine, Duchess of Braganza, among others. But, it was the conflict between António and Philip II that took centre stage: following António's defeat at the Battle of Alcântra, he remained king in only the Azores (barring São Miguel, where the nobles were indifferent to the monarch).

Rui, meanwhile, following his father's death had chosen to remain in Lisbon, and was there when the continent fell to Philip II. He aligned himself, and by association, his family to the Philippine succession. For his part, King Philip conceded to him, the title of Count of Vila Franca. At the time, the Countship was the highest honorific title that the King could bestow on a Portuguese citizen, especially one that was not his own son. There were few counts in Portugal, and many of them were wealthy and powerful. The selection of the designation was specifically chosen to privilege the nobles of the island of São Miguel, where the provincial capital had been of Vila Franca do Campo until 1522.

Yet, the municipal authorities at the time did not appreciate that D. Rui was named Count in their name, since that title was conferred by a Spanish King. Philip II undeterred responded that the title was merely honorific, and that the title did not transgress any of the rights and privileges of the "citizens" of the town.

Rui da Câmara eventually arrived in his countship along with a second fleet, ordered to the archipelago to conquer the island of Terceira, which had held out (along with other islands) the acclamation of Philip as King of Portugal. This began a period of unified power in the Azores under the flag of Spain, that would continue until the Restoration of Portuguese independence. In the meantime, the Gonçalves da Câmara line enjoyed privileges in the Azores, under successive Captains-Donataráios and Counts of Vila Franca.

In the aftermath of the succession of John IV to the throne, many of the islands of the Azores acclaimed the monarch and Rodrigo da Câmara, 3rd Count of Vila Franca, eventually accepted his reign following the defeat of the Spanish at the fortress of Terceira and a personal letter from John IV. Rodrigo kept his titles and privileges following the defeat, but, in 1650, the Inquisition investigated and arrested the Count from several complaints raised against him associated with sexual escapades. His possessions, privileges and titles were confiscated and his family's position was in crisis: the noble eventually died a miserable death in the Convent of Cape St. Vincent in 1601.  Although his wife was unable to liberate her husband, she was able to influence the King into restoring their family honours and possessions following her husband's death, thanks to her family connections as descendant of Vasco da Gama. Her son was the direct beneficiary of this warming of ties. Owing to the tarnished nature of the Countship of Vila Franca, it was decided by the King to substitute Ribeira Grande for the blemished former provincial title. The use of Vila Franca had already been a polemic decision in the first place, since Philip II of Spain had not consulted the Portuguese before instituting the honorific.

On the initiative of the Marquis of Pombal, King José I of Portugal signed a decree on August 2, 1766 creating the Captaincy General of the Azores, based in Angra do Heroísmo. The Captain General now governed the entire civil, judicial, and military service of the archipelago. By that same decree, the Captains were abolished, ending more than three hundred years of history. However, the family continued to hold their other noble titles until the establishment of the Portuguese Republic in 1910. João da Câmara, a playwright and son of the 8th Count of Ribeira Grande, was the first Portuguese citizen to be nominated for the Nobel Prize for Literature. in 1901.

The Cámara family in the Yucatan

In the 16th century, Juan de la Cámara, a Spanish nobleman and military officer, was one of the main commanders responsible for the conquest of Yucatán, later becoming, in 1542, one of the founders of the city of Mérida. Throughout the colonial period, family members remained loyal servants of the Spanish crown and, as a result, they were awarded many encomiendas throughout the Yucatan peninsula. On at least three occasions they had to prove their nobility in order to hold public office in the Captaincy General of Yucatán. At the beginning of the 19th century, when Mexico declared its Independence, the Cámara and Peón families, the two main criollo families in the region, competed in which had vaster landownings since both had a very extensive network of Haciendas. The privileges granted to the Cámara family were extraordinary, probably a concession in consideration of their antecedents in the Iberian Peninsula.

In the second half of the 19th century, henequen and sisal, two plant species native to the Yucatan Peninsula, became a valuable asset in demand by the industrial powers of Europe and North America for the manufacture of ropes. The export of these two species of plants brought considerable prosperity to Yucatan; At the turn of the century, Mérida, the state capital, was said to have more millionaires per capita than any other city in the world. The Cámara family, as one of the region's leading landowners, was well positioned to convert its network from farms to the production and export of henequen. They also participated in many ancillary industries such as banking and railways. In the second half of the 19th century and the first half of the 20th, various members of the family had an outstanding participation in industry and politics.

List of Counts of Vila Franca
 Rui Gonçalves da Câmara, 1st Count of Vila Franca (1578-1601)
  Manuel da Câmara, 2nd Count of Vila Franca (1601-1619)
 Rodrigo da Câmara, 3rd Count of Vila Franca (1619-1662)
 Manuel da Câmara, 4th Count of Vila Franca (1662-1673)

List of Counts of Ribeira Grande
 D. Manuel Luís Baltazar da Câmara, 1st Count of Ribeira Grande (1630–1675);
 D. José Rodrigo da Câmara, 2nd Count of Ribeira Grande (1665–1724);
 D. Luís Manuel da Câmara, 3rd Count of Ribeira Grande (1685–1723);
 D. José da Câmara, 4th Count of Ribeira Grande (1712–1757);
 D. Guido Augusto da Câmara e Ataíde, 5th Count of Ribeira Grande (1718–1770);
 D. Luís António José Maria da Câmara, 6th Count of Ribeira Grande (1754–1802);
 D. José Maria Gonçalves Zarco da Câmara, 7th Count of Ribeira Grande (1784–1820);

List of Marquess of Ribeira Grande
 D. Francisco de Sales Gonçalves Zarco da Câmara, 8th Count of Ribeira Grande (1819–1872), created 1st Marquis of Ribeira Grande' by decree of King Pedro V of Portugal, issued on September 5, 1855
 D. José Maria Gonçalves Zarco da Câmara, 9th Count of Ribeira Grande (1843–1907);
 D. Vicente de Paula Gonçalves Zarco da Câmara, 10th Count of Ribeira Grande (1875–1946);

Pretendants
Following the fall of the monarchy, the Republican government abolished noble and honorific titles. Yet, some of the descendants still maintained those honorific titles and claims, including: D. José Maria Gonçalves Zarco da Câmara; D. José Vicente Gonçalves Zarco da Câmara; and D. José Cabral Gonçalves Zarco da Câmara.

See also
 List of noble houses
 Count of Vila Franca
 Count of Ribeira Grande
 Portuguese nobility
 Spanish nobility
 Mexican nobility
 Juan Rodríguez de la Cámara
 João Gonçalves da Câmara (Zarco)
 Captains of the Donataries

 Bibliography 
 Barreto, Maxcahrenas. Portuguese columbus : secret agent of King John II.. London, England: Palgrave Macmillan, 2014. OCLC 935190217 
 Melo, Carlos. História dos Açores: Da descoberta a 1934 . Ponta Delgada: Câmara Municipal de Ponta Delgada, 2008.
 Faria e Maia, Francisco de Athayde M. de.. Capitães dos donatários (1439-1766). Lisboa, Portugal: Núcleo Gráfico da Escola Preparatória de F. Arruda, 1972. OCLC 976699653
 Valdés Acosta, José María. A Través de las Centurias (Vol. I).  México DF: Talleres Litográficos de la Impresora Bravo, 1979. OCLC 6626094
García Bernal, Manuela Cristina. La Sociedad en Yucatán (1700-1750). Sevilla, España: Editorial CSIC, 1972. OCLC 1178651
González Muñoz, Victoria and Martínez-Ortega, Ana. Cabildos y élites capitulares en Yucatán (1700-1725). Sevilla, España: Escuela de Estudios Hispano-Americanos de Sevilla, 1989. OCLC 782343653
Ladd, Doris. The Mexican Nobility at Independence (1780-1826) ''. Austin, Texas: Institute of Latin American Studies, 1976. OCLC 491921643

References

Cámara
Spanish noble families
Portuguese nobility
Portuguese noble families
Mexican nobility
Mexican noble families
Gonçalves da Câmara family